Peter Alexander Beinart (born February 28, 1971) is an American liberal columnist, journalist, and political commentator. A former editor of The New Republic, he has also written for Time, The New York Times, and The New York Review of Books among other periodicals. He is also the author of three books. He is a professor of journalism and political science at the Craig Newmark Graduate School of Journalism at the City University of New York. He is an editor-at-large at Jewish Currents, a contributor to The Atlantic, a political commentator for CNN, and a fellow at the Foundation for Middle East Peace.

Early life and education
Beinart was born in Cambridge, Massachusetts. His parents were Jewish immigrants from South Africa (his maternal grandfather was from Russia, and his maternal grandmother, who was Sephardic, was from Egypt). His father's parents were from Lithuania. His mother, Doreen (née Pienaar), is a former director of the human-rights film program at the John F. Kennedy School of Government at Harvard, and his father, Julian Beinart, is a former professor of architecture at the Massachusetts Institute of Technology. His stepfather is theatre critic and playwright Robert Brustein. Beinart attended Buckingham Browne and Nichols School in Cambridge.

He studied history and political science at Yale University, where he was a member of the Yale Political Union and graduated in 1993 with the Alpheus Henry Snow Prize. He was a Rhodes Scholar at University College, Oxford University, where he earned an M.Phil. in international relations in 1995.

Career
Beinart worked at The New Republic as the managing editor from 1995 to 1997, then as senior editor until 1999, and as the magazine's editor from 1999 to 2006. For much of that time he also wrote The New Republics "TRB" column, which was reprinted in the New York Post and other newspapers. From 2007 until 2009 he was a Senior Fellow at the Council on Foreign Relations. Beinart is Associate Professor of Journalism and Political Science at the City University of New York. He has written for Time, The New York Times, The New York Review of Books, and other periodicals. He has appeared on various TV news discussion programs and is a political commentator for CNN. His editor-in-chief at the Forward called him a "wunderkind". In March 2012, Beinart launched a new blog, "Open Zion", at Newsweek/The Daily Beast. He was also a senior political writer for The Daily Beast. In 2012, Beinart was included on Foreign Policy magazine's list of 100 top global thinkers.

On November 4, 2013, Haaretz announced that Beinart would be hired as a columnist beginning January 1, 2014. The same day, the Atlantic Media Company said he would join National Journal and write for The Atlantic'''s website beginning in January. Beinart would cease operating his blog at The Daily Beast. In January 2017 he left Haaretz and became a columnist for The Forward, where he stayed until the beginning of 2020, when he joined Jewish Currents as an editor-at-large.

In August 2018, Beinart said he was detained by Shin Bet at Israel's Ben Gurion Airport and questioned about his presence at West Bank protests and outspoken criticism of the Israeli government's policies toward the Palestinians. Beinart called his experience "trivial" when compared to the experiences of others, particularly Palestinians and Palestinian Americans who travel through Israel's main airport. Prime Minister Benjamin Netanyahu spoke with Israeli security forces, was told that Beinart's detention was an administrative mistake, and that the country "welcomes all—critics and supporters alike."

Works and views
Beinart was the editor of The New Republic when it came out in support of the 2003 Invasion of Iraq, and was identified as one of the major forces behind the magazine's support for the war; his status as a liberal hawk who supported the Iraq War is cited as a primary cause of his rise. In 2004, a New Republic editorial written during his editorial tenure assessed its support for the Iraq War thus: "We feel regret, but no shame. . . . Our strategic rationale for war has collapsed." In 2010, Beinart said he was motivated to support the Iraq War by a concern that Saddam Hussein was developing nuclear weapons.

Beinart is the author of the 2006 book The Good Fight: Why Liberals—and Only Liberals—Can Win the War on Terror and Make America Great Again. The book, which grew out of a 2004 article in The New Republic arguing that Democrats need to take the threat of Islamic totalitarianism more seriously, is a liberal defense of muscular interventionism abroad, particularly with a view to reforming various nations in the Middle East.

Beinart's second book, The Icarus Syndrome: A History of American Hubris (2010), "look[ed] back at the past hundred years of U.S. foreign policy in the baleful light of recent events [and found] the ground littered with ... the remnants of large ideas and unearned confidence [as demonstrable in] a study of three needless wars", World War I, the Vietnam War, and the Iraq War.

Sexual harassment controversy
	
On October 24, 2017, Leon Wieseltier, the literary editor at The New Republic from 1983 until his resignation in 2014, admitted to "offenses against some of my colleagues in the past" after several women accused him of sexual harassment and inappropriate sexual advances. Beinart, who was the magazine's editor at the time of the harassment of the woman, subsequently said had not done enough to stop the behavior and felt shame for not doing so.
		
Beinart wrote that when he reported one such incident in particular to Peretz— Wieseltier's harassment of Sarah Wildman, then an assistant editor of The New Republic— he was ignored. The sexual harassment only got worse. Beinart has since said that he was afraid if he pursued the matter further, he would be jeopardizing his own career.Wildman, Sarah. "I was harassed at the New Republic. I spoke up. Nothing happened.". Vox, Nov. 9, 2017.
	
According to The New York Times: "Several women... said they were humiliated when Mr. Wieseltier sloppily kissed them on the mouth, sometimes in front of other staff members. Others said he discussed his sex life, once describing the breasts of a former girlfriend in detail. Mr. Wieseltier made passes at female staffers, they said, and pressed them for details about their own sexual encounters."

Wildman later alleged that she was fired in retaliation for complaining: "In disclosing this incident to my superiors, the outcome was, in many ways, far worse than the act itself. It’s not exactly that I was disbelieved; it’s that in the end, I was dismissed", she wrote in Vox.
		
Wildman wrote that the sexual harassment went hand in hand with gender discrimination at the magazine during Peretz's and Beinart's tenure: "The women knew we had a far shallower chance of rising up the masthead than our male counterparts; all of us hoped we’d be the exception. To do so, we entered into a game in which the rules were rigged against us, sometimes pushing us well past our point of comfort in order to remain in play."
		
Peretz later claimed that he could recall nothing about the harassment. But Beinart later said and wrote that when he directly reported Wieseltier's harassment of Wildman to Peretz he was ignored, allowing the harassment to continue.Wildman, Sarah. "I was harassed at the New Republic. I spoke up. Nothing happened.". Vox, Nov. 9, 2017.

In a formal statement Beinart made in response to Wildman's article, he wrote: "I was complicit in an institutional culture that lacked professional procedures regarding sexual harassment, and which victimized women, including women I considered friends. I will always be ashamed of that, and will ensure that I am never similarly complicit again." He did not address whether Wildman was fired in retaliation for complaining about her harassment.

Peretz responded to Beinart's recollection of the two men specifically meeting to discuss the matter by saying: "Peter never, ever, ever reported this to me." He added, "I don't remember Sarah Wildman."

Personal life
As of 2012, Beinart lives in New York City. He keeps kosher, regularly attends an Orthodox synagogue, and sends his children to a Jewish school.

Publications
 
 
 
 

References

External links
 Column archives at The Daily Beast 
 
 C-SPAN Q&A interview with Beinart, April 3, 2005
 
 
 
 
 The Special Kind Of Hate That Drove Pittsburgh Shooter — And Trump by Peter Beinart
 Shield of the Republic: A New Democratic Foreign Policy by Peter Beinart
David Friedman. "Read Peter Beinart and you'll vote Donald Trump; His reflexive reaction to my involvement in the Trump candidacy lays bare how dangerous the Jewish left is to the State of Israel," Arutz Sheva'' (op-ed).

1971 births
Living people
20th-century Sephardi Jews
21st-century American essayists
21st-century American journalists
21st-century American male writers
21st-century Sephardi Jews
Alumni of University College, Oxford
American bloggers
American columnists
American foreign policy writers
American male non-fiction writers
American magazine editors
American male bloggers
American male journalists
American Orthodox Jews
American people of Egyptian-Jewish descent
American people of Lithuanian-Jewish descent
American people of Russian-Jewish descent
American people of South African-Jewish descent
American political commentators
American political writers
American Rhodes Scholars
American Sephardic Jews
The Atlantic (magazine) people
Buckingham Browne & Nichols School alumni
City University of New York faculty
Haaretz
Jewish American journalists
Jewish American writers
The New Republic people
The New York Times columnists
Time (magazine) people
Writers from Cambridge, Massachusetts
Writers on Zionism
Yale College alumni
21st-century American Jews